Ilonda Lūse (born 11 July 1972) is a Latvian speed skater. She competed at the 1994, 1998 and the 2002 Winter Olympics.

References

1972 births
Living people
Latvian female speed skaters
Olympic speed skaters of Latvia
Speed skaters at the 1994 Winter Olympics
Speed skaters at the 1998 Winter Olympics
Speed skaters at the 2002 Winter Olympics
Sportspeople from Riga